The 2009–10 Oklahoma State Cowboys men's basketball team represented Oklahoma State University in the 2009–10 NCAA Division I men's basketball season. This was head coach Travis Ford's second season at Oklahoma State. The Cowboys competed in the Big 12 Conference and played their home games at Gallagher-Iba Arena. They finished the season 22–11, 9–7 in Big 12 play. They lost in the quarterfinals of the 2010 Big 12 men's basketball tournament. They received an at–large bid to the 2010 NCAA Division I men's basketball tournament, earning a 7 seed in the Midwest Region, where they lost to 10 seed Georgia Tech in the first round.

Pre-season
In the Big 12 preseason polls, released October 14, Oklahoma State was selected to finish sixth in the Big 12 coaches poll.

Roster
Source

Schedule and results
Source
All times are Central

|-
!colspan=9| Exhibition

|-
!colspan=9| Regular Season

|-
!colspan=10| 2010 Big 12 men's basketball tournament

|-
!colspan=9| 2010 NCAA Division I men's basketball tournament

References

Oklahoma State
Oklahoma State
Oklahoma State Cowboys basketball seasons
2009 in sports in Oklahoma
2010 in sports in Oklahoma